An  or ollamh (anglicised as ollave or ollav), plural ollomain, in early Irish literature, is a member of the highest rank of filí. The term is used to refer to the highest member of any group; thus an ollam brithem would be the highest rank of judge, and an ollam rí the highest rank of king. Ollav was also applied to a druidic rank; meaning much the same as "professor", or person of great learning. Typically the ollav/ollam was endowed with a distinction equal to that of a king, and could therefore wear six colours.

There was an official post in ancient Ireland called the "Rí Ollam" or "Ard Ollam" or Chief Ollam of Ireland. The holder of the post had a standing equal to the High King of Ireland.

Ollamh Fodhla was the title of the mythical 18th High King of Ireland who is said to have first formed the assembly known as the Feis Teamhrach, or Feast of Tara around 1300 BCE.

Literary fosterage
In Ancient Ireland, ollams taught children either for payment or for no compensation.

See also

 Ollamh Érenn
Senchán Torpéist
Dallán Forgaill

References

Poets
Irish literature